The Martyrs of Abitinae (or Abitinian Martyrs) were a group of 49 Christians found guilty, in 304, during the reign of the Emperor Diocletian, of having illegally celebrated Sunday worship at Abitinae, a town in the Roman province of Africa. The town is frequently referred to as Abitina, but the form indicated in the Annuario Pontificio (and elsewhere) is Abitinae. The plural form Abitinae is that which Saint Augustine of Hippo used when writing his De baptismo in 400 or 401.

On February 24 of the year before, Diocletian had published his first edict against the Christians, ordering the destruction of Christian scriptures and places of worship across the Empire, and prohibiting Christians from assembling for worship.

Though Fundanus, the local bishop in Abitinae, obeyed the edict and handed the scriptures of the church over to the authorities, some of the Christians continued to meet illegally under the priest Saturninus. They were arrested and brought before the local magistrates, who sent them to Carthage, the capital of the province, for trial.

The trial took place on February 12 before the proconsul Anullinus. One of the group was Dativus, a senator. He was interrogated, declared that he was a Christian and had taken part in the meeting of the Christians, but even under torture at first refused to say who presided over it. During this interrogation, the advocate Fortunatianus, a brother of Victoria, one of the accused, denounced Dativus of having enticed her and other naive young girls to attend the service; but she declared she had gone entirely of her own accord.  Interrupting the torture, the proconsul again asked Dativus whether he had taken part in the meeting. Dativus again declared that he had. Then, when asked who was the instigator, he replied: "The priest Saturninus and all of us." He was then taken to prison and died soon after of his wounds.

The priest Saturninus was then interrogated and held firm even under torture.  His example was followed by all the others, both men and women.  They included his four children.

One of the responses of the accused has been frequently quoted. Emeritus, who declared that the Christians had met in his house, was asked why he had violated the emperor's command. He replied: "Sine dominico non possumus" - we cannot live without this thing of the Lord. He was referring to the celebration of the Holy Eucharist that the emperor had declared illegal, but in which they had chosen to participate even at the cost of being tortured and sentenced to death.

Saint Restituta is sometimes considered one of the Martyrs of Abitinae.

List of the Martyrs of Abitinae

The feast of the Martyrs of Abitinae is on February 12. Under that date the Roman Martyrology records the names of all forty-nine:

 Saturninus, Presbyter
 Saturninus, son of Saturninus, Reader
 Felix, son of Saturninus, Reader
 Maria, daughter of Saturninus
 Hilarion, infant son of Saturninus
 Dativus, also known as Sanator
 Felix
 another Felix
 Emeritus, Reader
 Ampelius, Reader
 Benignus, infant son of Ampelius
 Rogatianus
 Quintus
 Maximianus or Maximus
 Telica or Tazelita
 another Rogatianus
 Rogatus
 Ianuarius
 Cassianus
 Victorianus
 Vincentius
 Caecilianus
 Restituta
 Prima
 Eva
 yet another Rogatianus
 Givalius
 Rogatus
 Pomponia
 Secunda
 Ianuaria
 Saturnina
 Martinus
 Clautus
 Felix junior
 Margarits
 Maior
 Honorata
 Regiola
 Victorinus
 Pelusius
 Faustus
 Dacianus
 Matrona
 Caecilia
 Victoria, a virgin from Carthage
 Berectina
 Secunda
 Matrona
 Ianuaria

References

External links
  St. Saturninus
 Dictionary of Christian Biography and Literature to the End of the Sixth Century A.D., with an Account of the Principal Sects and Heresies.
 Santi Martiri di Abitina

304 deaths
Saints from Roman Africa (province)
4th-century Christian martyrs
4th-century Romans
Groups of Christian martyrs of the Roman era